Chinedum Uzoma Nwajiuba (born 1964) is a Nigerian academic and a professor of agricultural economics. He is the current Vice-Chancellor of the Federal University Ndufu Alike Ikwo in Ebonyi, Nigeria.

Education
Nwajiuba was born in Port Harcourt and studied at the University of Nigeria, Nsukka, where he obtained his BSc.Agric in 1986 and also later his MSc in Agricultural Economics in 1989. He proceeded to the University of Hohenheim, Germany for further studies, where he earned his PhD in Agricultural Economics in 1994. He later went to Imo State University where he acquired another MSc in Development economics in the year 2007.

Career
Chinedum Nwajiuba has previously worked as a part-time lecturer at the Michael Okpara University of Agriculture, Umudike, and additionally as an External Examiner to the university. In 2009/2010 he also worked as an adjunct lecturer at the Federal University of Technology Owerri. He has also been on the Governing Council of the Imo State University Teaching Hospital.

Positions held
Nwajiuba held the position of Deputy Dean to the Faculty of Agriculture and Veterinary Medicine from October 2005 to December 2005. Later, he held the position of Director of the Information Communication Technology Centre from January 2008 to February 2009. He then became Director of Academic Planning until December 2009. Nwajiuba was acting Vice-Chancellor of the university in 2012, as well as Dean to the School of Postgraduate Studies from November 2011 till February 2016.

Services
Chinedum as served (part-time) in the Nigerian Environmental Study Action Team (NEST) Ibadan as the Executive Director.

Personal life
Prof. Chinedum Nwajiuba is married to Dr. (Mrs,) Chinyere Nwajiuba and has children.

References

1964 births
Living people
People from Port Harcourt
Academic staff of the Federal University Ndufu Alike Ikwo
Vice-Chancellors of Nigerian universities